Matthijs van Heijningen (born 17 April 1944 in Alphen aan den Rijn) is a Dutch film producer. He is one of the country's most successful producers, and became known for a series of commercial successes and for screen adaptations of literary works. His collection is now housed in the Filmmuseum.

References

External links
 

1944 births
Living people
Dutch film producers
Dutch film directors
Golden Calf winners
People from Alphen aan den Rijn